Pittsburg Independent School District is a public school district based in Pittsburg, Texas (USA).  In addition to Pittsburg, the district serves the town of Rocky Mound as well as all of Camp County with the exception of a very small area that lies in the Gilmer Independent School District. Small portions of Upshur and Wood counties are also served by the Pittsburg Independent School District.

In 2009, the school district was rated "academically acceptable" by the Texas Education Agency.

Schools
Pittsburg High School (Grades 9-12)
Taking a cue from the Major League Baseball team, the school mascot is the pirate.
Pittsburg Junior High (Grades 7-8)
Pittsburg Intermediate (Grades 5-6)
Pittsburg Elementary (Grades 2-4)
Pittsburg Primary (Grades PK-1)

References

External links
Pittsburg ISD

Pittsburg Pirate Athletic Booster Club - click [1] below

School districts in Camp County, Texas
School districts in Wood County, Texas
School districts in Upshur County, Texas